The NF110 is a diesel-electric locomotive built by General Motors Diesel for narrow gauge service with the Canadian National Railways in Newfoundland (see: Newfoundland Railway).  Only nine examples were built between 1952 and 1953, although thirty-eight identical NF210 were later built.  The last examples were retired in 1986 and afterwards three examples were preserved in non-operating condition, all located in Newfoundland.

Fleet details

See also 
List of GMD Locomotives

References

External links 

NF110
C-C locomotives
3 ft 6 in gauge locomotives
Canadian National Railway locomotives
Diesel-electric locomotives of Canada
Railway locomotives introduced in 1952